= Didier Waterfall =

- Cascades du Didier
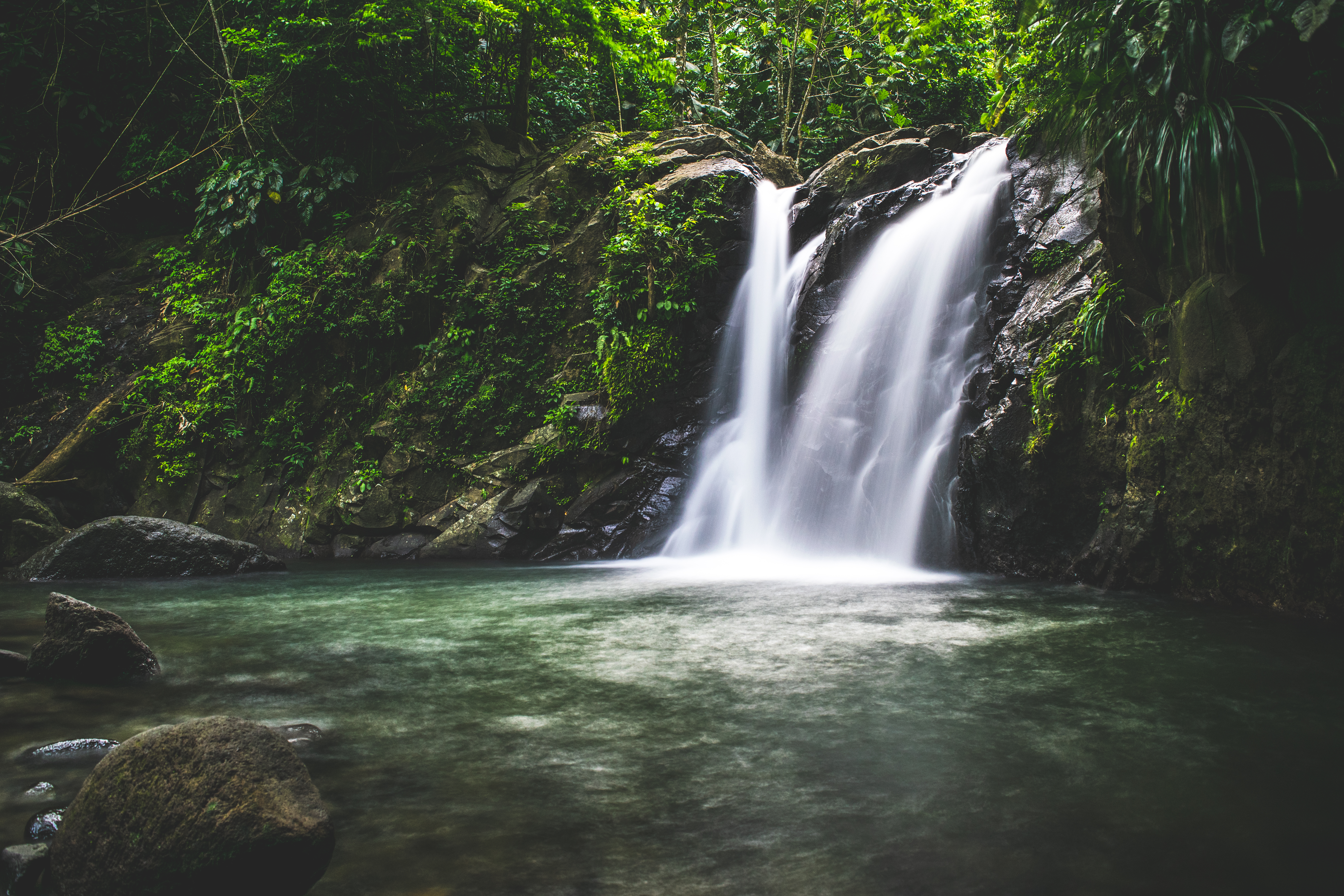
- Interactive map of Didier Waterfall
- Location: Fort-de-France
- Coordinates: 14.663°N 61.099°W
- Watercourse: Duclos River

Didier Waterfall, or Cascade Didier, is a waterfall located on Martinique. It contains three different drops. It is located behind a dam of the Duclos River.

On 13 May 2025, two hikers walking near the waterfall were swept away and died as the river swelled up and caught them.
